Overkill is an American thrash metal band, formed in 1980 in New Jersey. They have gone through many lineup changes, leaving bassist D.D. Verni and lead vocalist Bobby "Blitz" Ellsworth as the only constant members. In addition to Verni and Ellsworth, Overkill's current lineup includes Dave Linsk on lead guitar, Derek Tailer on rhythm guitar and Jason Bittner on drums. Along with Nuclear Assault and Anthrax, whose one-time lead guitarist Dan Spitz was also an early member of Overkill, the band is one of the most successful East Coast thrash metal bands, and they are often called "the Motörhead of thrash metal", based on their unique playing style, which was influenced by punk rock and the new wave of British heavy metal. The band has a notable mascot named "Chaly" (a skeletal bat with a skull-like face, horns, bony wings and green eyes) who has appeared on most of their album covers.

To date, Overkill has released nineteen studio albums, an album of cover songs, two EPs, one demo tape and three live albums. They were one of the first thrash metal bands to sign to a major label (having signed to Atlantic Records in 1986), and rose to fame as part of the genre's movement of the mid-to-late 1980s, along with the "Big Four" (Metallica, Megadeth, Slayer and Anthrax) as well as Exodus and Testament. Overkill achieved their first mainstream success with its second studio album and Atlantic debut, Taking Over (1987), which peaked at number 191 on the Billboard 200. The band's next five studio albums—Under the Influence (1988), The Years of Decay (1989), Horrorscope (1991), I Hear Black (1993) and W.F.O. (1994)—were also successful on the Billboard charts, with the latter two cracking the top ten on the Top Heatseekers chart. Following their split from Atlantic in 1995, Overkill went through some label changes, but continued to enjoy moderate underground success, particularly in Europe and Japan. The band experienced a resurgence of popularity in the U.S. during the 2010s, with three of their studio albums released that decade—The Electric Age (2012), White Devil Armory (2014) and The Grinding Wheel (2017)—reaching the top 100 on the charts. Overkill has sold over 16 million records worldwide; they are also estimated to have sold more than 625,000 records in the United States since the beginning of the SoundScan era.

History

Early years and Feel the Fire (1980–1986)

Overkill was formed in 1980 from the ashes of the punk band "the Lubricunts", featuring bassist D.D. Verni and drummer Rat Skates. Verni and Skates placed an ad looking for a guitarist and lead singer which was answered by guitarist Robert Pisarek and singer Bobby Ellsworth and the first incarnation of Overkill was formed. After rejecting several names, including "Virgin Killer," the band finally settled on "Overkill," named after Motörhead's second album.

Early covers, especially those done under the "Virgin Killer" name, were punk songs by the Ramones, Dead Boys and others. By late 1980, the band's setlist was made up of songs by bands such as Motörhead (Overkill and half of the Ace of Spades album), Judas Priest ("Tyrant" was their closer), and Riot. Along with the new influx of heavy metal covers, the band still played a smattering of punk covers, with extra distortion, intensity, and speed. In 1981, the band went through a succession of guitarists after Robert Pisarek left, first being replaced by Dan Spitz and Anthony , then Rich Conte and Mike Sherry, before settling with Bobby Gustafson in late 1982/early 1983. It was around this time that the band started writing original songs, including "Grave Robbers" (later renamed "Raise the Dead"), "Overkill", and "Unleash the Beast (Within)". More songs would follow, such as "Death Rider" (1981) and "Rotten to the Core" (1982). As the band continued to write songs, they became a staple at New York and New Jersey clubs, such as L'Amours.

In 1983, the lineup of Verni, Skates, Ellsworth, and Gustafson released the Power in Black demo, a recording that made as much impact in the underground tape trading circuit as demos by then-up-and-coming Bay Area thrash metal bands such as Exodus and Testament. Power in Black gained the band two compilation appearances. "Feel the Fire" was included on New York Metal '84 and "Death Rider" appeared on volume V of Metal Blade Records' Metal Massacre series. The success of Power in Black enabled the band to secure a small recording deal with Azra/Metal Storm Records that resulted in the 1985 four-track EP Overkill, which quickly sold out, instantly pushing the band to the forefront of the fledgling thrash metal movement. Long out of print, the vinyl-only EP is now considered a rare collector's item and all the songs appeared eleven years later on the compilation album !!!Fuck You!!! and Then Some.

Though it is said that the band never saw any money from the release, the Overkill EP garnered the band massive underground interest, and the attention of Jon Zazula, owner of Megaforce Records, one of the most prominent independent heavy metal record labels at the time. Megaforce signed Overkill to a multi-album record contract and released their full-length debut album Feel the Fire in 1985. Hailed by many critics and fans as a thrash metal masterpiece, the album cemented the band's position as one of the driving forces of the East Coast thrash movement. The band spent the better part of 1985 and 1986 touring in support of Feel the Fire, touring Europe with Anthrax and Agent Steel, and supporting Slayer on their Reign in Blood tour in North America. Overkill's grueling tour schedule and the growing buzz for Feel the Fire resulted in the band being courted by several major labels; they eventually signed to Atlantic Records, making Overkill one of the earliest thrash metal bands to sign to a major label.

Rise to success (1987–1990)
Overkill's second album, Taking Over, was released in March 1987; it was the first to be released by Megaforce in cooperation with Atlantic Records. The album featured longer songs and improved production. Taking Over also brought the band public recognition, becoming their first album to hit the Billboard 200, while Overkill's first-ever music video "In Union We Stand" received moderate airplay on MTV's Headbangers Ball. Another European tour followed, this time opening for Helloween. Overkill also opened for Megadeth on their Peace Sells tour in North America, and then headlined their own US tour, accompanied by Megaforce/Atlantic labelmates Testament.

In late 1987, the !!!Fuck You!!! EP was released, consisting of a studio recording of the Subhumans' song "Fuck You" as well as a handful of live tracks recorded earlier that year in Cleveland. 1987 also saw the departure of founding drummer Rat Skates. He was replaced by Mark Archibole for a short time, and then on a permanent basis by Danish drummer Bob "Sid" Falck, formerly of Paul Di'Anno's Battlezone. Overkill closed out the year with a one-off show at the Christmas on Earth festival in Leeds, England, together with Megadeth, Kreator, Nuclear Assault, Voivod, the Cro-Mags, Lȧȧz Rockit and Virus.

Overkill released their third album, Under the Influence, in July 1988. Once again produced by Alex Perialas, who had worked on the band's first two albums, Under the Influence was much more raw and thrashy, lacking most of the epic atmosphere heard on Taking Over. "Hello from the Gutter" was released as a single, and its music video gained regular airplay on Headbangers Ball. Overkill kept up constant touring all over the world, furthering their reputation as one of the most active live metal bands; this included opening for Slayer on their South of Heaven tour in the United States and Europe, and performing with other bands such as Anthrax, Motörhead, Anvil, Nuclear Assault, M.O.D., Testament, Vio-lence, King's X, Prong, Murphy's Law, Ludichrist and Znowhite.

Overkill released their fourth album, The Years of Decay, in October 1989. Produced by Terry Date (who would later work with Pantera, White Zombie and Soundgarden), the album featured the band's best production value to date, as well as Overkill's most progressive and diverse work compared to their previous albums. It combined the raw approach of Under the Influence with more complex song structures and epic elements of Taking Over, resulting in a more serious atmosphere and longer songs, including the eight-minute title track and the ten-minute "Playing With Spiders/Skullkrusher", the latter is the longest track Overkill has recorded to date. Although the album charted lower than Under the Influence on the Billboard 200 at number 155, The Years of Decay was a breakthrough album for Overkill, selling over 67,000 copies within the next decade-and-a-half, and includes one of the band's best-known songs "Elimination", for which a music video received regular airplay on MTV's Headbangers Ball. That song became a fan favorite and remains a staple in the band's live repertoire. Overkill toured relentlessly in support of The Years of Decay between November 1989 and June 1990, with bands such as Testament, Wolfsbane, Dark Angel, Vio-lence, Mordred, Powermad, Whiplash and Excel.

Horrorscope, I Hear Black and W.F.O. (1990–1995)
Not long after The Years of Decay tour ended in the summer of 1990, Gustafson parted ways with Overkill. Accounts vary as to exactly how and why he had split with the band: he was either fired by Verni and Ellsworth, or had left Overkill following an argument over the band's musical direction. Gustafson has stated that one of the reasons for his split with Overkill was due to disagreements over royalties, during which he became embroiled in a bitter feud with Verni and Ellsworth. The remaining members added two new guitarists to the band; Rob Cannavino, who had been Gustafson's guitar technician, and Merritt Gant, formerly of Faith or Fear. Ellsworth stated in an interview with Invisible Oranges years later that the reason Overkill had hired two guitarists was mainly because they wanted to do something different: "We knew if we replaced Bobby with one guitarist, we'd get compared to what we were. So, it seemed like to logical thing to bring in two players. We didn't want anyone to say, 'Bobby was better than this new guy.' And we wanted to perform old stuff with two guitars to keep in fresh. We realized that change isn't a bad thing."

The "new" Overkill recorded their fifth album Horrorscope, once again with Terry Date, in 1991. Featuring the furious riffs and trade-off solos of new guitarists Cannavino and Gant, and the refined songwriting of Verni and Ellsworth, Horrorscope quickly silenced worries from fans the band would not recover from their split with Gustafson. Today, the album is widely regarded as one of Overkill's defining moments and is arguably their heaviest release. Focusing on a darker, heavier style, the album spawned the doomy single "Horrorscope", a departure from the band's earlier singles, which had traditionally been uptempo songs. Horrorscope was also Overkill's first album to be accompanied by more than one music video or single; there were music videos for the title track and "Thanx for Nothin'" (both of which received some good airplay on Headbangers Ball), while other songs like "Coma", "Infectious" and the cover version of Edgar Winter's "Frankenstein" received particular attention (through radio or otherwise), therefore expanding the band's popularity in the heavy metal community, and helping the album enter the Top 30 on the Billboard Heatseekers chart. Overkill supported Horrorscope by touring North America with Anacrusis and Galactic Cowboys in 1991 and Armored Saint in 1992, after which Sid Falck left the band. Admittedly never a big fan of thrash metal music, Falck said that he had initially wanted to push his drumming to the limit by playing the most complex type of music (of the era), and in time he decided to pursue other musical interests.

Falck was replaced by former M.O.D. drummer Tim Mallare, with whom the next Overkill album I Hear Black was recorded. Released in March 1993, I Hear Black was produced by Alex Perialas (who previously produced their albums Taking Over and Under the Influence), and was the first Overkill album released directly through Atlantic Records. The album once again presented a change in style, from the heavy thrash of Horrorscope to a more stoner/blues rock-oriented style influenced by Black Sabbath. The eclectic nature of the album is often attributed to the fact that many different songwriters were involved. Verni and Ellsworth would handle most of the song writing themselves on subsequent albums, with only minor contributions from the other members. A music video was shot for "Spiritual Void" and it had received minor airplay on Headbangers Ball. The European leg of the 1993 "World of Hurt Tour" featured Savatage and Non-Fiction as support acts.

Overkill's self-produced seventh album W.F.O. (which stands for "Wide Fuckin' Open", a common biker term) was released on July 15, 1994 as an answer to the criticism that I Hear Black had received. The album presented a fast, heads-down, old school thrash metal style without any of the experimental elements present on I Hear Black in favor of a groove-oriented sound. The music video for "Fast Junkie" received little or no airplay from MTV, due to changing mainstream tastes and limited airplay availability for metal bands. Overkill continued to have bigger success overseas, mounting an extensive European tour in the fall, supported by Jag Panzer and Massacra.

With grunge dominating the airwaves in the United States, many heavy metal radio stations changing formats and Headbangers Ball going off the air, W.F.O. failed to find an audience and in 1995 Overkill left Atlantic Records. Overkill were happy to leave the mainstream label, where they felt they received little or no attention and signed to different record companies around the world (CMC International in the US).

A March 1995 show, once again in Cleveland, Ohio, was recorded for Overkill's first full-length live album, a 100-minute double CD entitled Wrecking Your Neck. The album was released in April 1995, with the first pressing featuring a bonus CD containing the Overkill EP that had been out of print for ten years. A music video for the song "Bastard Nation" taken from Wrecking Your Neck was also released, but again failed to receive airplay in the US.

Post-Atlantic years (1996–2001)

Late in 1995, both Cannavino and Gant decided to leave the band; Rob Cannavino to focus on motorcycle racing, and Merritt Gant to spend more time with his family. To everyone's surprise, Overkill then hired Joe Comeau, former singer of Liege Lord (now playing guitar). Comeau brought along former Anvil guitarist Sebastian Marino, with whom he had worked in the past. The new line up recorded The Killing Kind in 1996, again self-produced and mixed by Chris Tsangarides (Judas Priest). While staying well within the thrash genre, the album was a departure from its predecessor's more traditional thrash metal style and featured different elements such as hardcore, while the vocals showed influences from a broad spectrum of music. As Comeau was also a singer, backing vocals on The Killing Kind and subsequent albums were more elaborate and frequent than before, adding another element to the band's sound. Press response to The Killing Kind was very positive, but the album remains a hotly contested topic among the band's audience, with some longtime fans resistant to the new modern elements, and others hailing The Killing Kind as one of the band's finest moments.

Overkill toured Europe twice in support of The Killing Kind first in February 1996 with Megora and Accu§er, and then again in November with Anvil and Stahlhammer. In the summer of 1996, Overkill appeared on Volume 2 of Century Media's Legends of Metal – A Tribute to Judas Priest compilation, to which they contributed "Tyrant".

In summer 1997, the band released !!!Fuck You!!! and Then Some. The album included the !!!Fuck You!!! EP, which had been out of print for some years, along with the classic Overkill EP and two live tracks from a 1990 promo single. October of the same year saw the release of the ninth Overkill studio album, titled From The Underground And Below. This record retained some of the modern influences from The Killing Kind, while also reincorporating elements from the band's earlier efforts. Some songs on From The Underground And Below, including "Save Me", even had a slight industrial metal sound to them. Reportedly a video for the track "Long Time Dyin'" was shot, but received no television exposure. In 1998, once again the band opted to tour only Europe in support of the album, hitting the road with Nevermore, Angel Dust and Nocturnal Rites.

In 1998, Ellsworth was diagnosed with a very aggressive form of nose cancer and underwent immediate surgery, stopping the cancer before it spread. After his recovery, the band started work on their tenth studio album. The self-produced Necroshine was released in February 1999, making Overkill the first thrash metal band ever to release ten full-length studio albums (Other first wave thrash bands, such as Sodom or Kreator would not achieve this milestone until two years later). While once again quite different from the previous records and musically not considered "classic" Overkill, the album was vocally even more experimental than The Killing Kind, and was well received by fans and critics alike.

Before the release of Necroshine, Sebastian Marino left Overkill to spend more time with his family. He was replaced by Dave Linsk from the New Jersey hardcore/thrash metal band Anger On Anger. A two-week European trip in June was arranged to fill the gap between appearances at the Dynamo and With Full Force festivals.

September 1999 saw the release of Coverkill, an album consisting entirely of cover versions from bands that were especially influential to Overkill, such as Black Sabbath (featured three times), Kiss, Motörhead, Manowar, and The Ramones. Some of the tracks had been previously available on compilations or as bonus tracks, but others had been shelved for years (the earliest recording was from the Under the Influence sessions) or were recorded immediately prior to the album's release. A full European tour in support of both Necroshine and Coverkill took place in February 2000, as Overkill co-headlined with Canadian thrash metal band Annihilator, with the German band Dew-Scented in the opening slot.

During the European tour, Annihilator fired their lead singer Randy Rampage due to his disruptive behavior. A few months later, Joe Comeau was confirmed as his replacement, effectively ending his tenure with Overkill. The band returned to the studio, this time as a four-piece, and in the fall of 2000, released Bloodletting. Once again produced by the band, and mixed by Colin Richardson.

November of the same year saw the band again touring Europe as a special guest of Halford's "Resurrection" world tour. Since Overkill had not found a new rhythm guitarist yet, Comeau joined on a temporary basis for the tour. For the last couple of shows, the band also utilized another session musician. With D.D. Verni's wife about to give birth to their second child, Verni was to miss a week or two of shows and needed a fill-in. Derek Tailer of Dee Snider's band S.M.F was asked to do the job. In 2002, Tailer was announced as a permanent member of Overkill, although not on bass, but filling the vacant rhythm guitarist position.

Switching labels and drummers (2002–2008)

After taking a break, Overkill resurfaced in 2002 with Wrecking Everything, their second full-length live album, recorded at the Paramount Theatre in Asbury Park, New Jersey. The album contained only songs that had not been on Wrecking Your Neck, some simply because they were released on later albums, but also a few early songs from albums such as Taking Over and Under the Influence. The same show was used for Overkill's first ever DVD, Wrecking Everything – An Evening in Asbury Park, also released in 2002.

The European tour in June 2002, supporting both Bloodletting and Wrecking Everything, saw Blaze and Wicked Mystic opening up for Overkill. During the second to last show of the tour in Nuremberg, Germany, Blitz suffered a stroke on stage and collapsed. For nearly three days, rumors ran rampant, reporting everything from Blitz being in a coma, permanently paralyzed, or even that Blitz had died. Finally, three days later, the band announced that the stroke was very minor and had no lasting consequences, as well as no cause that could be determined by the doctors.

Overkill signed to Spitfire Records and entered the studio in late 2002 to record their next studio album, Killbox 13. Produced by the band and Colin Richardson and released in March 2003, the album was actually only their twelfth regular studio album, but the Overkill EP was also counted to achieve the number 13. The album received critical acclaim, combining the "new" Overkill with their raw early style as presented on the debut album Feel the Fire. Touring for the album included a number of European festivals during the summer, and a full European tour followed in November with Seven Witches and After All. The band played without Derek Tailer, who was absent for undisclosed reasons. Nobody was hired to fill in for him, so Overkill toured as a four-piece for the first time since 1990. Tailer was still considered a full member of the band.

In late 2004, after a Japanese tour with Death Angel and Flotsam and Jetsam, the band started work on another record in D.D. Verni's own recording studio. The album, ReliXIV, was produced and mixed by the band themselves and released in March 2005.

Overkill toured the eastern US in April 2005, and just before they went on a European tour in May, it was announced that Tim Mallare would not take part in this tour. Replacing him for the tour was former Hades drummer Ron Lipnicki. A few weeks later, the band announced that Mallare had left permanently and Lipnicki was his replacement. In the summer of 2005, Overkill organized their first US west coast tour in more than ten years, playing Western Canada to Southern California. The tour was such a success that the band was added to the 2006 Gigantour bill, as second stage headliners, marking Overkill's first nationwide US tour since 1994.

Now with the Bodog Music label, the band rejoined forces with Jonny and Marsha Zazula, previous owners of Megaforce Records, who are now part of the Bodog Team in the United States. Overkill released its 15th studio album, Immortalis, on October 9, 2007. The album featured the lineup of founders Bobby "Blitz" Ellsworth and D.D. Verni, guitarists Dave Linsk and Derek Tailer, and new drummer Ron Lipnicki. Lamb of God vocalist Randy Blythe contributed vocals on the song "Skull and Bones".

Return to popularity and departure of Lipnicki (2009–2017)
On October 30, 2009, it was reported that Overkill had inked a multi-album deal with Nuclear Blast Records. The band's 15th album, Ironbound—which is described as a true "thrashter-piece"—was released on February 9, 2010. The album marked something of a "comeback" for Overkill after years of lackluster record sales and a decline in popularity in the U.S. since the mid-1990s; it was also the band's first album to appear on the Billboard 200 chart since 1993's I Hear Black, peaking at number 192. The band happened to be playing at Times Square in New York City on May 1, 2010, as part of their Ironbound tour when someone nearby attempted unsuccessfully to blow a car up using fireworks. The show proceeded without interruption, but some ticket holders arriving late were prevented from entering the theater by police responding to the incident. Overkill toured for almost two years by promoting Ironbound; it started with a European trek in February 2010 (supported by Suicidal Angels, Savage Messiah and Cripper), followed two months later by a U.S. tour with Vader, God Dethroned, Warbringer, Evile and Woe of Tyrants. The band toured the U.S. again in the fall (this time with Forbidden, Evile, Gama Bomb and Bonded by Blood), and then did a European run in March 2011 with Destruction, Heathen, After All and Bonded by Blood. The tour cycle for Ironbound ended in South America in the fall of 2011.

In July 2011, Overkill began demoing six songs and were planning to begin recording their 16th album in October for an early 2012 release. The resulting album, The Electric Age, was released on March 27, 2012, and it was the band's first album to enter the top 100 on the Billboard 200, peaking at number 77; this was also Overkill's highest-chart position at the time. In 2013, the band embarked on The Dark Roots of Thrash tour of North America, headlined by labelmates Testament along with Flotsam and Jetsam, and 4Arm. However, they canceled their February 15 show in Huntington at The Paramount Theatre due to singer Bobby "Blitz" being diagnosed with "walking pneumonia". On February 18, it was announced that Overkill was officially dropped out of the Dark Roots of Thrash tour as Blitz's condition had gotten slightly worse after the show in Worcester, Massachusetts.

On August 31, 2013, Overkill entered Gear Recording on to begin recording their seventeenth studio album. The album was going to be released on March 7, 2014. On January 14, however, it was announced that the album was postponed to July. On March 15, it was revealed that the new album was going to be titled White Devil Armory. After some delays, White Devil Armory was finally released on July 22, 2014. The album was their most successful; it peaked at #31 on the Billboard 200, making it Overkill's highest chart position so far.

On November 5, 2015, it was announced that Overkill would play a special show on April 16, 2016 in Oberhausen where they played the Feel the Fire and Horrorscope albums in their entirety. The show was professionally filmed and recorded for the DVD Live in Overhausen, which was released on May 18, 2018.

Overkill released a box set, titled Historikill: 1995–2007, on October 16, 2015. To support the box set, Overkill embarked on a North American tour with Symphony X in September–October 2015, and a UK tour in April 2016. In a September 2015 interview, Bobby "Blitz" Ellsworth revealed that Overkill had begun writing their eighteenth studio album, and by March 2016, they had "fully demoed" eleven songs for it. Ellsworth said in a March 2016 interview that Overkill would begin recording the album in early May for an October release. On April 16, 2017, the band announced that their drummer Ron Lipnicki would miss the European tour due to a family emergency, and that he would be replaced by Eddy Garcia, which was later confirmed to be a "personal issue" from Lipnicki. On August 13, 2016, The Grinding Wheel was announced as the name of the album, and Ellsworth said that the band was "looking for a first-week-of-November release"; however, the album's release date was pushed back to February 10, 2017. The Grinding Wheel was another successful album for Overkill; it reached at number 69 on the Billboard 200, making it the band's second-highest chart position behind White Devil Armory. To support the album, Overkill toured North America with Nile, and supported former Sepultura members Max and Igor Cavalera in Europe on the Return to Roots tour. They also headlined the 2017 edition of the Metal Alliance Tour, supported by Crowbar, Havok, Black Fast and Invidia.

Jason Bittner-era (2017–present)

On May 4, 2017, Overkill announced that Jason Bittner (Shadows Fall and formerly of Flotsam and Jetsam) had replaced Lipnicki as the drummer of the band. Lipnicki later went on to join Whiplash.

On February 9, 2018, Overkill announced that they were in the studio working on demos for their nineteenth studio album. Pre-production of the album began that April, and Ellsworth announced that it would be released in February 2019. On June 1, 2018, the band announced that they had begun recording the album. During an interview with Eddie Trunk on Trunk Nation on October 10, 2018, bassist D.D. Verni announced that the album was finished; he was quoted as saying, "I just got the final sequencing and all that, so that's all buttoned up. We're working on the cover now. We still don't have a title — we're gonna have to come up with that soon — but we have a lot of things floating around. And the new release will probably be in February." On November 28, 2018, Overkill announced that the album was titled The Wings of War and would be released on February 22, 2019. The band promoted the album by headlining the 2019 edition of the Killfest Tour, supported by Destruction, Flotsam and Jetsam and Meshiaak, touring North America in the spring with Death Angel and Mothership, and performing at Megadeth's first-ever MegaCruise in the Pacific Ocean that October. They continued to tour in support of The Wings of War in 2020, including touring the US with Exhorder and Hydraform, and appearing at a handful of metal-related festivals in Europe.

In June 2019, it was reported that Overkill was expected to start writing new material for their 20th studio album by the beginning of 2020. In an interview with Metal Exhumator in October 2019, Ellsworth said, "We just sat down and talked about starting to write in the spring. Maybe late spring, early summer, just say maybe we should just schedule some time to do it. But there's been no ideas with regard to where it's going to go." Bittner revealed in an April 2020 interview with Metal Pilgrim that Verni had written nine songs for their new album, but added that plans to enter the studio were postponed due to the COVID-19 pandemic: "So our plan was to start working on new material, but considering the fact that we have to stay in our spaces right now, we're just kind of doing things electronically and it's just given D.D. some more time to write. Because we were kind of on a little bit of a timeline, 'cause we — well, all right, I'll say we had a plan, but everybody had a plan before last month." He also mentioned that a European tour in March 2021 to support the album was in the works: "We have no idea if that's gonna even be a possibility right now, because timelines that we had for the record label and whatnot are no longer those anymore, because the record label is shut down and nobody is doing any business right this very second." Ellsworth stated in an interview with A&P Reacts in June 2020 that the new Overkill album was expected to be released in April 2021, with a tour supporting it to follow; Bittner later revealed that the band had recorded 11 demos for the album, and added, "I think right now, the last time I talked to D.D., our idea is to try to start getting drums done, like, September-ish, depending on what happens. The problem is that we really can't do our regular pre-production right now, because we all don't live in the same state." On September 5, 2020, Bitter announced on his Facebook profile that Overkill would enter the studio on September 14 to begin recording their new album. Drum tracks had been finished by October, and mixing was handled by Colin Richardson, who had previously worked with Overkill in the late 1990s and early 2000s. In an interview on That Metal Interview in October 2020, Bittner said its release could be pushed back to the fall of 2021 due to the COVID pandemic, explaining, "Lord knows what's gonna happen. God forbid it gets worse. It might even be pushed back even longer. But the point is at least we're gonna get it done." Verni reiterated Bittner's comments about a possible release date, saying, "I don't know. We're trying to coordinate it maybe with some touring. We don't really have any touring till next July, I think, our first shows. We have shows [booked] in July, August, September, October. Whether any of them are gonna happen, I don't know, but probably something like that for the new Overkill release. So I'll be working on that between now and then." Bittner later stated that the release of the new album was pushed back to February 2022. In an August 2021 interview on Trunk Nation With Eddie Trunk, Verni revealed that Overkill was still recording their new album and planning to mix it in the fall for a March 2022 release coincided with a tour. However, Ellsworth stated in a March 2022 interview that it was not expected to be released before April 2023.

On November 13, 2021, Overkill performed their first show in "609 f!!kin' days" at The Wellmont Theater in New Jersey; supported by Demolition Hammer and Sworn Enemy, it was a make-up date for a show that was initially scheduled to take place on March 14, 2020, but was cancelled because of the COVID-19 pandemic. At this show, Phil Demmel (formerly of Machine Head and currently of Vio-lence) filled in for guitarist Dave Linsk, who was unable to perform. Demmel filled in for him again during the band's spring 2022 tour with Prong.

On December 9, 2022, the band debuted a new song titled "Wicked Place" during their performance at the Ruhrpott Metal Meeting festival in Oberhausen from their upcoming album. The 20th studio album Scorched is scheduled to be released on April 14, 2023. In support of the album, Overkill will embark on a headlining European tour with Exhorder and Heathen.

Legacy and style
While less popular than larger bands of the same genre, Overkill is one of the oldest thrash metal bands performing today. Although their debut album was not released until 1985, Overkill's formation predates the formation of all of the "Big Four" of thrash metal bands (Metallica, Megadeth, Anthrax and Slayer) by at least one year. After the band's inception, as time passed and Overkill began creating more music alongside its quickly-growing competitors, it became known for its fast and heavy style. The band's music lacked enough variety to rival the names of the "Big Four", but Overkill maintained its unique sound unwaveringly throughout its career instead of trying to gain popularity with a more commercial style. Overkill has been viewed as one of the most important thrash bands from the East Coast, and they are considered to be one of the most active bands of the genre; unlike many of their thrash peers, Overkill has never disbanded or gone on hiatus, nor released a new studio album in more than three years.

Along with Exodus and Testament, Overkill has been the subject of which thrash metal band should be included in an expanded "Big Four". Asked in September 2014 about the idea of either Overkill, Exodus or Testament being included in the "Big Five" of thrash metal, frontman Bobby Ellsworth replied, "Aw man, that's gonna put me in a corner! We measure our success in days, not dollars! But maybe you can find the answer in what I'm going to say. When [playing thrash metal] became harder in the '90s with grunge music, we never had a question about if we would stop doing it and go work for our moms and dads or something. We just needed to make it happen. We weren't going to let grunge stop us. And if it did, we'd just go back to the underground. I liked it there anyway!" Commenting on the fact that Overkill never became part of the "Big Four", Ellsworth stated, "When it comes to being selected and not selected, that's a simple accounting issue. When you talk numbers, numbers make the world go around, numbers put food on your table, and numbers put the 'Big Four' in arenas. And they sell enough records to do that. For me, it's not a concern. To even be asked the question from you is quite a compliment with regard to, let's say, our longevity or tenacity doing what we like doing. But this is quite simply an accounting issue. He who sells the most gets the pole positions."

Overkill's sound has influenced the genre of thrash metal. Their technique draws on bits and pieces of punk and hard rock as well as NWOBHM. These elements blend to create a fast, aggressive style unique to the band and make Overkill's sound easily recognizable to metal fans; as a result, they have been referred to as "the Motörhead of thrash metal". The band has been influenced by a variety of music, including heavy metal, hard rock, progressive rock and classic rock acts such as Black Sabbath, Led Zeppelin, Deep Purple, Iron Maiden, Accept,Judas Priest, The Who, Aerosmith, Rush, KISS, Alice Cooper, Queen, UFO, Jethro Tull, Motörhead, Saxon, Venom, Ted Nugent, Humble Pie, Rainbow, Manowar, Wishbone Ash and Starz, as well as punk rock and glam rock acts such as the Ramones, the Sex Pistols, The Damned, the New York Dolls, Lou Reed, The Vibrators, Generation X and the Dead Boys.

Many of today's new-wave thrash bands have been influenced by Overkill, including Evile, Havok and Mantic Ritual, the latter of whom incorporates a variety of stylistic traits reminiscent of Overkill and other thrash bands that had found success in the past. The band has also been cited as an influence on the groove metal genre; Pantera guitarist Dimebag Darrell had cited Bobby Gustafson's performance on the albums Under the Influence and The Years of Decay as the source of inspiration for the band's transition from glam metal to thrash/groove metal, as well as The Years of Decay producer Terry Date's production for Pantera's 1990 album Cowboys from Hell.

Members

Current members
 Carlo "D.D." Verni – bass, backing vocals 
 Bobby "Blitz" Ellsworth – lead vocals 
 Dave Linsk – lead guitar, backing vocals 
 Derek "The Skull" Tailer – rhythm guitar, backing vocals 
 Jason Bittner – drums

Discography

 Feel the Fire (1985)
 Taking Over (1987)
 Under the Influence (1988)
 The Years of Decay (1989)
 Horrorscope (1991)
 I Hear Black (1993)
 W.F.O. (1994)
 The Killing Kind (1996)
 From the Underground and Below (1997)
 Necroshine (1999)
 Bloodletting (2000)
 Killbox 13 (2003)
 ReliXIV (2005)
 Immortalis (2007)
 Ironbound (2010)
 The Electric Age (2012)
 White Devil Armory (2014)
 The Grinding Wheel (2017)
 The Wings of War (2019)
 Scorched (2023)

References

External links

 
 
 

1980 establishments in New Jersey
American thrash metal musical groups
American groove metal musical groups
Atlantic Records artists
Heavy metal musical groups from New Jersey
MNRK Music Group artists
Musical groups established in 1980
Musical quintets
Nuclear Blast artists
Megaforce Records artists
Regain Records artists
CMC International artists